Snowy River may refer to:
Snowy River, a major river in south-east Australia
Snowy River National Park, a national park in Australia, located adjacent to portions of the Snowy River
Snowy River Shire, a local government area in Australia
Snowy River (Tasmania), a tributary of North Esk River in Australia
Snowy River (New Zealand), a river on the west coast of New Zealand's South Island

See also
The Man from Snowy River (poem), a poem by Australian bush poet Banjo Paterson
The Man from Snowy River (1982 film), an Australian adventure drama movie based on the poem
The Man from Snowy River II, the sequel
The Man from Snowy River (TV series), an Australian adventure drama television series based on the poem
Snowy River Cave, a cave complex in New Mexico, USA